Dorrance Wilhelm Funk (May 4, 1919 – June 3, 1973) was an American professional wrestler. He is the father of wrestlers Dory Funk Jr. and Terry Funk, and was a promoter of the Amarillo, Texas-based Western States Sports promotion.

Early life 
Funk was born in Hammond, Indiana, on May 4, 1919 as the son of Emma E. (Gust) and Adam Funk. He was an Indiana high school state champion amateur wrestler for three years at Hammond High School in Hammond, Indiana, as well as an Indiana State University Amateur Athletic Union champion for one year.

Professional wrestling career 
Funk began his career as a professional wrestler after serving in the United States Navy during World War II, starting in the southwest United States. He wrestled primarily in the Texas territories and the Central States territories during his career. Mainly a junior heavyweight, he fought Iron Mike DiBiase, Mike Clancy, Danny Hodge and Verne Gagne. After Dory Jr. won the NWA Heavyweight championship in 1969, he was at ringside for many of his son's title defences.

Retirement 
After retirement he began promoting Western States Sports with Doc Sarpolis in Amarillo, Texas, where he led a thriving wrestling scene which produced many stars, including his sons Dory Funk Jr. and Terry Funk, as well as Stan Hansen, Harley Race, Gene Kiniski, Tully Blanchard, Ted DiBiase, Tito Santana, Bruiser Brody, Ricky Romero, Jumbo Tsuruta, and Genichiro Tenryu. Many of his wrestlers had played football at West Texas State University in nearby Canyon, Texas. Funk had a good business relationship with All Japan Pro Wrestling founder Shohei Baba, which led Funk's talent pool to useful international experience. Funk was also heavily involved with the Cal Farley Boys Ranch in Amarillo.

On July 15, 2006, Funk was posthumously inducted into the George Tragos/Lou Thesz Professional Wrestling Hall of Fame at the International Wrestling Institute and Museum in Newton, Iowa. The award was accepted by Terry.

Death  
Funk died at St. Anthony's Hospital after suffering a heart attack on June 3, 1973 at the age of 54, while demonstrating a wrestling hold at his home to a visitor at his Flying Mare Ranch in Umbarger, Texas. He was buried at Dreamland Cemetery in Canyon, Texas.

Championships and accomplishments 
 Championship Wrestling from Florida
 NWA Florida Southern Tag Team Championship (1 time) - with Jose Lothario
 George Tragos/Lou Thesz Professional Wrestling Hall of Fame
 Class of 2006
 National Wrestling Alliance
 NWA Hall of Fame (Class of 2013)
 NWA All-Star Wrestling
 NWA Pacific Coast Tag Team Championship (Vancouver version) (2 times) - with Lou Thesz (1) and Pancho Pico (1)
 Professional Wrestling Hall of Fame and Museum
 Class of 2020
 Western States Sports
 NWA Brass Knuckles Championship (Texas version) (2 times)
 NWA North American Heavyweight Championship (Amarillo version) (17 times)
 NWA North American Tag Team Championship (Amarillo version) (7 times) - with Bob Geigel (1), Dick Hutton (1) and Ricky Romero (5)
 NWA Southwest Junior Heavyweight Championship (8 times)
 NWA Southwest Tag Team Championship (4 times) - with Cowboy Carlos (2) and Bob Geigel (2)
 NWA Western States Heavyweight Championship (3 times)
 NWA World Junior Heavyweight Championship (1 time)
 NWA World Tag Team Championship (Amarillo version) (4 times) - with Bob Geigel (1), Dick Hutton (2) and Rip Rogers (1)
 Wrestling Observer Newsletter
 Wrestling Observer Newsletter Hall of Fame (Class of 1996)

References

External links 

 Handbook of Texas Online - Dory Funk Sr.
 
 

1919 births
1973 deaths
20th-century American male actors
American male professional wrestlers
American male stage actors
People from Hammond, Indiana
Professional wrestlers from Indiana
Professional Wrestling Hall of Fame and Museum
Professional wrestling trainers
Professional wrestling promoters
Stampede Wrestling alumni
Western States Sports
20th-century professional wrestlers
NWA World Junior Heavyweight Champions